Héctor Miguel Lombard Pedrosa (born 2 February 1978) is a Cuban and Australian professional mixed martial artist, bodybuilder, and former Olympic judoka who competes in the Light Heavyweight division of Eagle FC. Lombard has also competed in the middleweight and welterweight divisions. Lombard is best known for his tenure in the Ultimate Fighting Championship and has also fought in Deep, Pride, and Bellator where he was the inaugural Bellator Middleweight Champion.

Early life
Lombard was born in Cuba and represented his nation of birth at the 2000 Sydney Olympics in lightweight division of the Judo competition, a sport in which he is a fourth degree black belt. While in Australia, he met his future wife and the two decided to settle on the Gold Coast, where he began training with renowned kickboxer Nathan Corbett at Five Rings Dojo. In 2006, Lombard and his wife welcomed their first child Leonardo to the world. Lombard currently trains at the American Top Team facility in Coconut Creek, Florida. Marcus "Conan" Silveira (ATT Head Coach) awarded Lombard with a black belt in Brazilian jiu-jitsu following his victory at CFC 12.

Mixed martial arts

PRIDE
In 2006, Lombard fought twice in PRIDE. He lost both fights by unanimous decision, the first to Akihiro Gono and the second to Gegard Mousasi.

Cage Fighting Championship
Lombard headlined the first Cage Fighting Championship show on 28 July 2007, where he fought top Australian fighter Kyle Noke. The result was a controversial draw. On 23 November 2007, Lombard defeated French kickboxer and actor, Jean-François Lénogue to be the CFC Middleweight Champion. He has defended his title six times, with the last title defence coming against Art Santore. Lombard next successfully defended his belt against UFC veteran Joe Doerksen at CFC 16 on 25 March 2011.

Ultimate Fighting Championship
Lombard was scheduled to compete for the promotion at UFC 78, but was forced to withdraw due to visa issues.

EliteXC
On 18 April 2008, EliteXC released a press statement citing the signing of Héctor Lombard. His first opponent was scheduled to be Scott Smith in November, but the fight was later cancelled after the collapse of the promotion.

Bellator Fighting Championships
On 6 January 2009, it was announced that Héctor Lombard had signed an exclusive agreement with Bellator Fighting Championships. He fought and defeated Virgil Lozano and Damien Stelly to make it to the finals and fight for the first Bellator Middleweight Championship belt. Lombard defeated Jared Hess via doctor stoppage in the fourth round to win the middleweight title.

Lombard was scheduled to face Paulo Filho in a non-title bout on 13 May 2010 at Bellator 18, but Filho pulled out of the bout on 10 May due to an alleged visa issue and was replaced by Jay Silva. Lombard scored the fastest knockout in Bellator history by recording a six-second win, surpassing Eddie Sanchez and his ten-second KO win over Jay White.

Lombard then faced former NFL player Herbert Goodman in a non-title fight on 12 August 2010 at Bellator 24. He won the fight via KO (punches) in the first round.

On 28 October 2010, Lombard defeated Alexander Shlemenko in a 1st season winner vs. a 2nd season winner matchup to retain the Bellator Middleweight Championship at Bellator 34. He was the first man in Bellator history to successfully defend his title belt in any weight division.

Lombard next fought Falaniko Vitale in a non-title bout at Bellator 44. He won via KO in third round.

Lombard fought in another non-title bout against Trevor Prangley at Bellator 58 on 19 November 2011. Lombard won the fight via second-round TKO.

On 30 January 2012, Lombard's contract with Bellator expired.

Australian Fighting Championship
Lombard also captured the inaugural Australian Fighting Championship (AFC) middleweight title when he submitted Jesse Taylor in the second round with a heel hook at AFC 2. In the first and beginning of the second rounds, he used superior strength to out-grapple Taylor. This victory would extend his winning streak to 24 wins

Ultimate Fighting Championship
It was confirmed on 24 April 2012 that Héctor Lombard had signed with the UFC. Lombard was expected to make his UFC debut against Brian Stann on 4 August 2012 at UFC on Fox 4. However, Stann was forced out of the bout citing a shoulder injury. In turn, Lombard was pulled from the card and instead faced Tim Boetsch on 21 July 2012 at UFC 149, replacing an injured Michael Bisping. Even though Lombard scored a knockdown and a couple of takedowns, he lost the fight by split decision.

Lombard faced Rousimar Palhares on 15 December 2012 at UFC on FX 6. Lombard knocked Palhares out in the first round with ground and pound after having knocked him down with punches.

Lombard was defeated by Yushin Okami at UFC on Fuel TV: Silva vs. Stann on 3 March 2013.

Lombard next dropped down to the welterweight division to face Nate Marquardt on 19 October 2013 at UFC 166. He won the fight via knockout in the first round.

Lombard faced Jake Shields on 15 March 2014 at UFC 171. He won the fight via unanimous decision.

Lombard was expected to face Dong Hyun Kim on 23 August 2014 at UFC Fight Night 48. However, he pulled out of the bout and was replaced by Tyron Woodley. Lombard faced returning UFC veteran Josh Burkman on 3 January 2015 at UFC 182. He won the fight by unanimous decision. Subsequent to the event, it was revealed that he failed his post-fight drug test, testing positive for the anabolic steroid desoxymethyltestosterone.

Lombard was expected to face Rory MacDonald on 25 April 2015 at UFC 186. However, on 10 February, the UFC indicated that both participants had been removed from the card and that the pairing had been scrapped as both fighters are expected to be rebooked against a new opponent.

On 23 March 2015, it was announced that Lombard had been suspended for one year (retroactive to 3 January) and fined his original $53,000 win bonus, plus one-third of the rest of his purse, which included $53,000 in show money, and had his win over Josh Burkman overturned to a no contest by the Nevada Athletic Commission (NSAC) for failing his UFC 182 drug test. In addition to his suspension, fine, and overturning of the win, he also must pass a drug test prior to getting re-licensed by the NSAC.

Losing Streak

In his first fight after the PED suspension was lifted, Lombard faced Neil Magny on 20 March 2016 at UFC Fight Night 85. After nearly finishing Magny with strikes in the first round, he was stopped via TKO in the third round.

Lombard faced Dan Henderson in a middleweight bout on 4 June 2016 at UFC 199. After a back and forth first round, he was stopped via KO in the second round.

Lombard was expected to face Brad Tavares on 28 January 2017 at UFC on Fox 23. However, the bout was scrapped on January 10 due to undisclosed reasons. Lombard was quickly rescheduled and faced Johny Hendricks on 19 February 2017 at UFC Fight Night 105. He lost the back-and-forth fight via unanimous decision.

Lombard faced Anthony Smith on 16 September 2017 at UFC Fight Night 116. He lost the fight via KO in the third round.

Lombard faced C. B. Dollaway on 3 March 2018 at UFC 222. At the conclusion of the first round, Lombard landed two strikes after the horn, which rendered Dolloway unable to continue. As a result, Lombard was disqualified.

Lombard faced Thales Leites on September 22, 2018, at UFC Fight Night 137. He lost the fight via unanimous decision.

Eagle Fighting Championship 
Lombard faced Thiago Silva on May 20, 2022 at Eagle FC 48. After initially knocking down Silva in the first round, Lombard was knocked down himself in the second, before being hit with an illegal knee that rendered him unable to continue. As a result the fight was declared a no contest.

Bare-knuckle boxing
On October 8, 2019, it was announced that Lombard had left the UFC and had signed with Bare Knuckle FC. The UFC announced that it had terminated Lombard's contract that September. Lombard was expected to headline BKFC 10 against fellow UFC veteran Joe Riggs in February 2020. However, in January, the company announced that Lombard will instead be facing David Mundell, with no further information. Lombard won the fight via unanimous decision.

In the sophomore bout of his bare knuckle boxing tenure, Lombard faced fellow UFC veteran Kendall Grove at BKFC 12 on September 11, 2020. He won the fight by knockout in the first round.

BKFC Cruiserweight Champion
Lombard then faced Joe Riggs for the inaugural BKFC Cruiserweight Championship at BKFC 18 on June 26, 2021. He won the fight and claimed the championship via fourth-round technical knockout. Immediately after the fight, Lombard had his post-fight interview interrupted by fellow BKFC competitor Lorenzo Hunt resulting in Lombard punching Hunt in the face twice, initiating a minor brawl.

Lombard then attempted his first title defense against Lorenzo Hunt at BKFC 22 on November 12, 2021. He ended up losing the title via unanimous decision.

Championships and accomplishments

Mixed martial arts
Bellator Fighting Championships
Bellator Middleweight World Championship (One time; First)
One successful title defense
Bellator Season 1 Middleweight Tournament Winner
Fastest Recorded Knockout in Bellator History (0:06)
Tied with Douglas Lima for 2nd most Knockout wins in Bellator History (8)
Cage Fighting Championship
CFC Middleweight Championship (One time; First)
Most successful CFC title defences (Seven)
Australian Fighting Championship
AFC Middleweight Championship (One time; First)
Xtreme Fighting Championships (Australia)
XFC Light Heavyweight Championship (One time; First)
Bleacher Report
2011 MMA All-Star Second Team
Sherdog
2011 All-Violence Second Team
2010 All-Violence First Team
Inside MMA
2009 Bloodbath of the Year Bazzie Award vs. Jared Hess on 19 June

Bare-knuckle boxing
Bare Knuckle Fighting Championship
BKFC Cruiserweight Championship (one time; first; current)

Judo
International Judo Federation
2004 Gold : Australian Open, 81 kg and Open Weight (+100 kg)
2002 Bronze : International Open Tre Torri, Italy – 73 kg
2002 Silver : International Open Guido Sieni Tournament, Italy – 73 kg
2001 Gold : Torneo International Jose Ramon Rodrigues City Santiago de Cuba – 73 kg
2001 Silver : Tre Torri International Open – 73 kg
2001 7th place: Hungarian Open – 73 kg
2001 Bronze : World Masters Germany – 73 kg
2001 Silver : Austria Open – 73 kg
2000 Member of the Cuban Olympic Team – 73 kg
2000 Gold : Torneo International Jose Ramon Rodriges, City Santa Clara – 73 kg
1999 7th Place: Paris Open – 73 kg
1998 Silver : Campeonato Ibero Americano – 73 kg
Federacion Cuba de Judo
2002 Undefeated: World Team Championships, Suiza – 73 kg
2001 Gold : Cuban National Championships, City Santiago de Cuba – 73 kg
2000 Gold : Cuban National Championships, City Santa Clara – 73 kg
1999 Gold : Cuban National Championships – 73 kg
1998 Silver : National Seniors Cuba Championship – 73 kg
1997 Bronze : National Seniors Cuba Championship, Ciudad de la Havana – 73 kg
1997 Gold : Junior Cuba Nationals Championship, Ciudad Santa Clara – 73 kg
1994 College National Champion, City Las Tunas – 71 kg
1993 College National Champion, City Ciudad de la Havana – 71 kg
1991 College National Champion, City Isla de la Juventud – 52 kg

Kickboxing record

|- style="background:#cfc;"
|
| Win
| Daniel Paterson
|Prosecution 2
| Melbourne, Australia
| UD
|3
|2:00
| 2–0
|- style="background:#cfc;"
|
| Win
| Ronnie Najjar
|Fight Force Presents: QBH Kickboxing
| Melbourne, Australia
| SD
|3
|2:00
| 1–0
|-
| colspan=9 | Legend:

Mixed martial arts record

|-
|NC
|align=center|34–10–1 (3)
|Thiago Silva
|No Contest (illegal knee)
|Eagle FC 47
|
|align=center|2
|align=center|1:44
|Miami, Florida, United States
|
|-
|Loss
|align=center|34–10–1 (2)
|Thales Leites
|Decision (unanimous)
|UFC Fight Night: Santos vs. Anders 
|
|align=center|3
|align=center|5:00
|São Paulo, Brazil
|
|- 
|Loss
|align=center|34–9–1 (2)
|C. B. Dollaway
|DQ (punches after the bell)	
|UFC 222 
|
|align=center|1
|align=center|5:00
|Las Vegas, Nevada, United States
|
|-
| Loss
| align=center| 34–8–1 (2)
| Anthony Smith
| KO (punch)
| UFC Fight Night: Rockhold vs. Branch
| 
| align=center|3
| align=center| 2:33
| Pittsburgh, Pennsylvania, United States
|
|-
| Loss
| align=center| 34–7–1 (2)
| Johny Hendricks
| Decision (unanimous)
| UFC Fight Night: Lewis vs. Browne
| 
| align=center|3
| align=center| 5:00
| Halifax, Nova Scotia, Canada
|
|-
| Loss
| align=center| 34–6–1 (2)
| Dan Henderson
| KO (elbow)
| UFC 199
| 
| align=center|2
| align=center|1:27
| Inglewood, California, United States
| 
|-
| Loss
| align=center| 34–5–1 (2)
| Neil Magny
| TKO (punches)
| UFC Fight Night: Hunt vs. Mir
| 
| align=center|3
| align=center|1:26
| Brisbane, Australia
|
|-
| NC
| align=center| 34–4–1 (2)
| Josh Burkman
| No Contest (overturned by NSAC)
| UFC 182
| 
| align=center| 3
| align=center| 5:00
| Las Vegas, Nevada, United States
| 
|-
| Win
| align=center| 34–4–1 (1)
| Jake Shields
| Decision (unanimous)
| UFC 171
| 
| align=center| 3
| align=center| 5:00
| Dallas, Texas, United States
| 
|-
| Win
| align=center| 33–4–1 (1)
| Nate Marquardt
| KO (punches)
| UFC 166
| 
| align=center| 1
| align=center| 1:48
| Houston, Texas, United States
| 
|-
| Loss
| align=center| 32–4–1 (1)
| Yushin Okami
| Decision (split)
| UFC on Fuel TV: Silva vs. Stann
| 
| align=center| 3
| align=center| 5:00
| Saitama, Japan
| 
|-
| Win
| align=center| 32–3–1 (1)
| Rousimar Palhares
| KO (punches)
| UFC on FX: Sotiropoulos vs. Pearson
| 
| align=center| 1
| align=center| 3:38
| Gold Coast, Australia
| 
|-
| Loss
| align=center| 31–3–1 (1)
| Tim Boetsch
| Decision (split)
| UFC 149
| 
| align=center| 3
| align=center| 5:00
| Calgary, Alberta, Canada
| 
|-
| Win
| align=center| 31–2–1 (1)
| Trevor Prangley
| TKO (punches)
| Bellator 58
| 
| align=center| 2
| align=center| 1:06
| Hollywood, Florida, United States
| 
|-
| Win
| align=center| 30–2–1 (1)
| Jesse Taylor
| Submission (heel hook)
| Australian Fighting Championship 2
| 
| align=center| 2
| align=center| 1:26
| Melbourne, Australia
| 
|-
| Win
| align=center| 29–2–1 (1)
| Falaniko Vitale
| KO (punch)
| Bellator 44
| 
| align=center| 3
| align=center| 0:54
| Atlantic City, New Jersey, United States
| 
|-
| Win
| align=center| 28–2–1 (1)
| Joe Doerksen
| TKO (doctor stoppage)
| CFC 16
| 
| align=center| 1
| align=center| 4:13
| Sydney, Australia
| 
|-
| Win
| align=center| 27–2–1 (1)
| Alexander Shlemenko
| Decision (unanimous)
| Bellator 34
| 
| align=center| 5
| align=center| 5:00
| Hollywood, Florida, United States
| 
|-
| Win
| align=center| 26–2–1 (1)
| Herbert Goodman
| KO (punches)
| Bellator 24
| 
| align=center| 1
| align=center| 0:38
| Hollywood, Florida, United States
| 
|-
| Win
| align=center| 25–2–1 (1)
| Jay Silva
| KO (punches)
| Bellator 18
| 
| align=center| 1
| align=center| 0:06
| Monroe, Louisiana, United States
| 
|-
| Win
| align=center| 24–2–1 (1)
| Art Santore
| TKO (doctor stoppage)
| CFC 12
| 
| align=center| 1
| align=center| 4:23
| Sydney, Australia
| 
|-
| Win
| align=center| 23–2–1 (1)
| Joey Gorczynski
| Decision (unanimous) 
| G-Force Fights
| 
| align=center| 3
| align=center| 5:00
| Miami, Florida, United States
| 
|-
| Win
| align=center| 22–2–1 (1)
| Kalib Starnes
| TKO (submission to punches)
| CFC 11
| 
| align=center| 1
| align=center| 1:55
| Sydney, Australia
| 
|-
| Win
| align=center| 21–2–1 (1)
| Jared Hess
| TKO (doctor stoppage)
| Bellator 12
| 
| align=center| 4
| align=center| 1:41
| Hollywood, Florida, United States
| 
|-
| Win
| align=center| 20–2–1 (1)
| Damien Stelly
| TKO (punches) 
| Bellator 9
| 
| align=center| 1
| align=center| 2:56
| Monroe, Louisiana, United States
| 
|-
| Win
| align=center| 19–2–1 (1)
| Virgil Lozano
| KO (punch) 
| Bellator 3
| 
| align=center| 1
| align=center| 1:10
| Norman, Oklahoma, United States
| 
|-
| Win
| align=center| 18–2–1 (1)
| Ron Verdadero
| TKO (suplex and punches)
| CFC 7
| 
| align=center| 1
| align=center| 0:20
| Sydney, Australia
| 
|-
| Win
| align=center| 17–2–1 (1)
| Brian Ebersole
| TKO (submission to punches)
| CFC 5
| 
| align=center| 4
| align=center| 1:56
| Sydney, Australia
| 
|-
| Win
| align=center| 16–2–1 (1)
| Fabiano Capoani
| KO (elbows)
| CFC 4
| 
| align=center| 2
| align=center| 0:23
| Sydney, Australia
| 
|-
| Win
| align=center| 15–2–1 (1)
| Tristan Yunker
| TKO (corner stoppage)
| CFC 3
| 
| align=center| 1
| align=center| 3:10
| Sydney, Australia
| 
|-
| Win
| align=center| 14–2–1 (1)
| Damir Mihajlovic
| Decision (unanimous)
| Serbia vs. Australia
| 
| align=center| 3
| align=center| 5:00
| Belgrade, Serbia
| 
|-
| Win
| align=center| 13–2–1 (1)
| Jean-François Lenogue
| Decision (unanimous)
| CFC 2
| 
| align=center| 3
| align=center| 5:00
| Sydney, Australia
| 
|-
| Win
| align=center| 12–2–1 (1)
| Tatsuya Kurisu
| TKO (corner stoppage)
| X-Agon 2
| 
| align=center| 1
| align=center| 0:48
| Sydney, Australia
| 
|-
| Draw
| align=center| 11–2–1 (1)
| Kyle Noke
| Draw
| CFC 1
| 
| align=center| 3
| align=center| 5:00
| Sydney, Australia
| 
|-
| Win
| align=center| 11–2 (1)
| Fabio Galeb
| KO (punches)
| OFC 1
| 
| align=center| 1
| align=center| 3:24
| Sydney, Australia
| 
|-
| Win
| align=center| 10–2 (1)
| Yusaku Tsukumo
| Decision (unanimous)
| WR 9
| 
| align=center| 3
| align=center| 5:00
| Gold Coast, Australia
| 
|-
| Win
| align=center| 9–2 (1)
| James Te Huna
| TKO (shoulder injury)
| WR 8
| 
| align=center| 1
| align=center| 3:50
| Sydney, Australia
| 
|-
| Win
| align=center| 8–2 (1)
| Eiji Ishikawa
| TKO (punches)
| Deep: 28 Impact
| 
| align=center| 1
| align=center| 0:50
| Bunkyo, Japan
| 
|-
| Loss
| align=center| 7–2 (1)
| Gegard Mousasi
| Decision (unanimous)
| Pride – Bushido 13
| 
| align=center| 2
| align=center| 5:00
| Yokohama, Japan
| 
|-
| Win
| align=center| 7–1 (1)
| Jae Young Kim
| Submission (armbar)
| Spirit MC 9
| 
| align=center| 1
| align=center| 1:36
| Seoul, South Korea
| 
|-
| Win
| align=center| 6–1 (1)
| Michael Ravenscroft
| Decision (unanimous)
| Dojo KO
| 
| align=center| 3
| align=center| 5:00
| Melbourne, Australia
| 
|-
| Loss
| align=center| 5–1 (1)
| Akihiro Gono
| Decision (unanimous)
| Pride – Bushido 11
| 
| align=center| 2
| align=center| 5:00
| Saitama, Japan
| 
|-
| Win
| align=center| 5–0 (1)
| Mathew Toa
| Submission (armbar)
| UP
| 
| align=center| 1
| align=center| 0:36
| Gold Coast, Australia
| 
|-
| Win
| align=center| 4–0 (1)
| Daiju Takase
| KO (punch)
| X-plosion 13
| 
| align=center| 1
| align=center| 4:40
| Gold Coast, Australia
| 
|-
| Win
| align=center| 3–0 (1)
| David Frendin
| KO (punches)
| XFO 10
| 
| align=center| 1
| align=center| 0:52
| Gold Coast, Australia
| 
|-
| Win
| align=center| 2–0 (1)
| Adam Bourke
| Submission (toe hold)
| XFC 9
| 
| align=center| 1
| align=center| 1:44
| Gold Coast, Australia
| 
|-
| NC
| align=center| 1–0 (1)
| Cris Brown
| No Contest (accidental headbutt)
| WR 3
| 
| align=center| 1
| align=center| N/A
| Brisbane, Australia
| 
|-
| Win
| align=center| 1–0
| Michael Grunindike
| Decision (unanimous)
| SRF 11
| 
| align=center| 2
| align=center| 5:00
| Gold Coast, Australia
|

Modified rules: fight record

Bare knuckle record

|-
|Loss
|align=center|3–1
|Lorenzo Hunt
|Decision (unanimous)
|BKFC 22: Lombard vs. Hunt
| 
|align=center|5
|align=center|2:00
|Miami, Florida, United States
|
|-
|Win
|align=center|3–0
|Joe Riggs
|TKO (doctor stoppage)
|BKFC 18: Beltran vs. Shewmaker
| 
|align=center|4
|align=center|1:07
|Miami, Florida, United States
|
|-
|Win
|align=center|2–0
|Kendall Grove
|TKO (punches)
|Bare Knuckle FC 12
|
|align=center|1
|align=center|1:50
|Daytona Beach, Florida, United States
|
|-
|Win
|align=center|1–0
|David Mundell
|Decision (unanimous)
|Bare Knuckle FC 10
|
|align=center|5
|align=center|2:00
|Fort Lauderdale, Florida, United States
|
|-

See also
 List of current UFC fighters
 List of male mixed martial artists

References

External links
 
 

1978 births
Living people
Doping cases in mixed martial arts
Cuban male mixed martial artists
Cuban practitioners of Brazilian jiu-jitsu
Cuban sportspeople in doping cases
Middleweight mixed martial artists
Bellator MMA champions
Cuban Muay Thai practitioners
Sportspeople from Matanzas
Australian people of Cuban descent
Sportspeople of Cuban descent
Olympic judoka of Cuba
Judoka at the 2000 Summer Olympics
Australian male mixed martial artists
Australian male judoka
Australian Muay Thai practitioners
Australian practitioners of Brazilian jiu-jitsu
Australian sportspeople in doping cases
Mixed martial artists utilizing judo
Mixed martial artists utilizing Muay Thai
Cuban male judoka
People awarded a black belt in Brazilian jiu-jitsu
Ultimate Fighting Championship male fighters
Bare-knuckle boxers
Mixed martial artists utilizing Brazilian jiu-jitsu